Ryan Mark Donaldson (born 1 May 1991) is an English professional footballer who plays as a midfielder for Morpeth Town.

Club career

Newcastle United
Donaldson joined his hometown club at aged 9. He made his way through the academy to the u18s where he reached the semi final of the FA Youth Cup in 2007 and captained the team to the fifth round in 2009 where they lost out to Manchester City.

After being promoted to the first team for the 2008–09 season, Donaldson made the bench for a handful of games but did not manage to make an appearance. He eventually made his league and home debut for Newcastle on 31 August 2009 in the 1–0 home win against Leicester City and then made his second appearance as a second-half substitute for Ryan Taylor playing the final 15 minutes of the game in a 4–0 victory over Ipswich Town on 26 September 2009. He made his full debut when Chris Hughton handed him and several youngsters a starting role in the 22 September League Cup game away at Peterborough United. He was a regular member of the squad which won the championship that season, collecting a winners medal after the last game of the season at home to Ipswich Town.

His second Newcastle start came in the 2010–2011 season when he played in the second round League Cup tie against Accrington Stanley in central midfield alongside Haris Vučkić.

On 24 January 2011, Donaldson joined Hartlepool United on a month-long loan. He made his debut the following day in a 1–1 draw with Notts County. On 25 February, Hartlepool extended Donaldson's loan for a further month. After his next loan move to Tranmere was cut short by a torn hamstring, he was released by Newcastle United on 1 June 2012.

Gateshead
On 17 August 2012, Donaldson turned down interest from League 1 and the SPL to sign for local Conference Premier side Gateshead until 1 January 2013. He made his debut the following day as a substitute in a 1–1 draw with Forest Green Rovers. He scored his first senior goal on 24 August 2012 in a 2–1 win over Stockport County, before being sent off late in the game. On 26 November 2012, Donaldson signed an extension to his contract until the end of the 2012–13 season.

Cambridge United
On 23 May 2013, Donaldson chose to leave Gateshead and signed for Cambridge United on a two-year deal when the 12/13 came to a close, thus reuniting with his former Newcastle academy director Richard Money. Donaldson scored twice in Cambridge's 4–0 FA Trophy victory over Gosport Borough. He then scored the winner in the Conference Promotion Final as Cambridge overcame his old team Gateshead 2–1 at Wembley. He received the man of the match award on both Wembley visits.

Donaldson left Cambridge United at the end of the 2015–16 season.

Plymouth Argyle
Donaldson became the first summer signing for Plymouth Argyle in June 2016.

Donaldson made 22 appearances before he was sidelined in December 2016 with a broken jaw, suffered during a training ground collision.

Hartlepool United
Donaldson signed for Hartlepool United on a two-year deal in June 2017.

After his first season, Donaldson was made available for transfer by manager Matthew Bates. However, he was back in favour and made team captain under new manager Craig Hignett and signed a contract extension in May 2019.

Donaldson scored what proved to be the decisive penalty in a 5–4 shoot-out win over Torquay United in the 2021 National League promotion final. This helped Hartlepool to return to the EFL after a four-year absence and secured the club's first promotion in 14 years.

On 13 July 2021, Donaldson left Hartlepool after turning down a deal to stay at the club.

Morpeth Town
On 16 July 2021, Donaldson signed for Morpeth Town.

International career
In the summer of 2007, Donaldson was called up to the England U17 squad and made his debut on 31 July at the Nordic Championships, helping them to a third-place finish. He took part in the Algarve Tournament the following summer and England's unsuccessful 2008 UEFA European Under-17 Championship qualifying campaign.

Donaldson was promoted to the U19's and made his debut in September 2009. He started and scored the opening goal in a 3–1 win over Slovenia.

He played regularly during the U19's run to the European Championship semi-final before they were defeated 3–1 by Spain.

Career statistics

Honours
Cambridge United
FA Trophy: 2013–14
Conference Premier play-offs: 2014

Plymouth Argyle
League Two runner-up: 2016–17

Hartlepool United
National League play-offs: 2021

References

External links

1991 births
Living people
Footballers from Newcastle upon Tyne
English footballers
England youth international footballers
Association football midfielders
Newcastle United F.C. players
Hartlepool United F.C. players
Tranmere Rovers F.C. players
Gateshead F.C. players
Cambridge United F.C. players
Plymouth Argyle F.C. players
Morpeth Town A.F.C. players
English Football League players
National League (English football) players